The 1925 Bucknell Bison football team was an American football team that represented Bucknell University as an independent during the 1925 college football season. In its second season under head coach Charley Moran, the team compiled a 7–3–1 record and shut out seven of its eleven opponents.

The team played its home games at Bucknell University Memorial Stadium in Lewisburg, Pennsylvania. The stadium opened for the 1924 football season, having been built at a cost of $500,000 with seating for 18,000 spectators.

Schedule

References

Bucknell
Bucknell Bison football seasons
Bucknell Bison football